Horace Jackson (March 29, 1898 – January 26, 1952) was an American Academy Award-nominated screenwriter of the silent and sound film eras. Jackson also worked as a set designer early in his career.

Life and career
Born Horace Atherton Jackson on March 29, 1898, to Harry S. Jackson and Lena Atherton Jackson in Illinois.  There are conflicting sources as to whether he was born in East St. Louis or Venice, Illinois, both suburbs of St. Louis, Missouri. His father died when he was five, and several years later his mother moved him and his sister, Helen, to the Boyle Heights area of Los Angeles in approximately 1910. Prior to working in films, Jackson was an architect.

Jackson broke into the film industry dressing sets on the 1923 silent film, The Unknown Purple. Within months, he had moved up to the title of either "art director" or "set director". He would be the co-set director on the 1925 classic, Ben-Hur. He continued in the set design arena during the remainder of silent era, however with the advent of talking pictures Jackson would move into the screenwriting profession.  His first effort was the screenplay adaptation of Benjamin Glazer and Melchior Lengyel's story for 1929's Strange Cargo, directed by Arthur Gregor.

During 1929 through the beginning of the 1940s, Jackson would be the screenwriter or story creator on almost 30 films. Some of his better known films are: Sin Takes a Holiday in 1930; 1937's Breakfast for Two, starring Barbara Stanwyck; and his final two films in 1941, Model Wife (starring Joan Blondell and Dick Powell), and Bedtime Story with Fredric March and Loretta Young. Holiday, Jackson's adaptation of Philip Barry's 1928 play of the same name, would be honored with an Academy Award nomination at the 4th Academy Awards in 1932, however, he lost to the big winner of those awards, Cimarron (written by Howard Estabrook).

He was also reported as one of a plethora of writers who worked on the screenplay for the 1942 film The Night Before the Divorce, although he received no screenplay credit. In 1947, he sued Republic Pictures for plagiarism regarding the film Calendar Girl (1947). According to a 1949 New York Times article, Jackson and his writing partner, Irene Homer, were successful in their suit, receiving a "substantial sum".

On January 26, 1952, Jackson would die in a car accident.

Filmography
(as per AFI's database)

References

American male screenwriters
1898 births
1952 deaths
Film directors from Illinois
Road incident deaths in California
20th-century American male writers
20th-century American screenwriters